Rawiri Tareahi (fl. 1820–1850) was a notable New Zealand tribal leader. Of Māori descent, he identified with the Ngāti Kahungunu iwi. He was born in Te Poraiti, Hawke's Bay, New Zealand in the late 18th century. He had several children – a son Porokoru Mapu, daughters Hepora, Ani Kanara Marewa and Rawinia Kaingaroa, and son Pāora Kaiwhata. Tareahi died possibly in the 1850s.

References

Year of birth unknown
1850s deaths
Ngāti Kahungunu people